Alcalà de Xivert is a town and municipality in the Baix Maestrat comarca, province of Castelló, Valencian Community, Spain.

Geography 
The main town is located inland in a flat valley between the two mountain ranges of Serra d'Irta and Serra de les Talaies. There is no river in the valley; instead, the water emerges in natural ponds known as basses.

History
Its castle occupied  a strong position for the control of the routes along the Mediterranean coast. Here stood a Moorish castle (the name of the town derives from Arabic al-qalat = "the castle") that was captured by James I of Aragon in 1234, who also resettled the place with Christian villagers.

On 30 August 1905, scientists came from all over the world to Alcalà de Xivert to watch a total solar eclipse which covered an area from the coast of North Africa to the North-East of Spain.

In contemporary times the economy of the town is devoted mainly to tourism, with several beaches and a busy marina at the villages located on the coast, Alcossebre, Capicorb and Les Fonts.

Villages
Alcalà de Xivert, 3,971 
Alcossebre, 2,151
Capicorb, 260
Les Fonts, 1,502

Sites of interest 

The landmark of the town is the Esglèsia de Sant Joan Baptista (Church of Saint John the Baptist), built in 1736–1766, with a large dome, a noteworthy Baroque portal, and a 68-metre-high tower, which is visible from many miles away.

The castle of Xivert, was built by the Moors in the 12th century and later conquered by the Knights Templar.

References

External links

 Web de l'Ajuntament d'Alcalà de Xivert
 Institut Valencià d'Estadística.
 Portal de la Direcció General d'Administració Local de la Generalitat.

Municipalities in the Province of Castellón
Baix Maestrat